Joe Okafor  (born June 5, 1991) is a former American football nose tackle. He played college football at Lamar University. He was signed by the Pittsburgh Steelers as an undrafted free agent in 2015.

References

1991 births
Living people
American football defensive tackles
American people of Igbo descent
Igbo sportspeople
American sportspeople of Nigerian descent
African-American players of American football
Lamar Cardinals football players
Pittsburgh Steelers players
Players of American football from Texas
Sportspeople from Harris County, Texas
People from Bellaire, Texas
21st-century African-American sportspeople